Mikhail Alekseevich Nazarychev (born 2 April 2001) is a Russian pair skater. With his former partner, Iuliia Artemeva, he is the 2020 World Junior bronze medalist, the 2020 Russian junior national bronze medalist, the 2019 JGP Croatia champion, the 2019 JGP Russia silver medalist, and a 2019–20 Junior Grand Prix Final qualifier and winner of the Russian Junior Championship 2021

Career

Early years 
Nazarychev began learning to skate in 2005 at the age of four. He competed as a single skater up until the 2016–17 figure skating season when he began competing in pairs with his first partner, Alyona Krokhaleva. Krokhaleva/Nazarychev competed together for only one season before parting ways. Nazarychev competed with his next partner, Alina Mammadova, through the end of the 2017–18 figure skating season before teaming up with Artemeva during the off-season prior to the start of the 2018–19 season. Artemeva/Nazarychev only competed domestically during 2018–19 and finished 10th at 2019 Russian Elder Age Nationals.

2019–20 season 
Artemeva/Nazarychev made their international junior debut in September at the 2019 JGP Russia. The team placed second in both their short program and their free skate to earn a silver medal on the all Russian podium between teammates Kseniia Akhanteva / Valerii Kolesov and Diana Mukhametzianova / Ilya Mironov. At their second Junior Grand Prix assignment, 2019 JGP Croatia, Artemeva/Nazarychev won gold and set new personal bests after placing second in the short program and first in the free skate, thus qualifying to the 2019–20 Junior Grand Prix Final. In qualifying to the Final, Artemeva/Nazarychev secured byes into the 2020 Russian Figure Skating Championships on both the senior and junior levels. They placed fourth at the Final.

Seventh at the senior nationals, they were bronze medalists at junior nationals, securing a place at the 2020 World Junior Championships in Tallinn, Estonia. Artemeva/Nazarychev were third in the short program, narrowly behind second-place finishers Akhanteva/Kolesov. The free skate proved a struggle, Artemeva falling on both throw jumps as well as her side-by-side double Axel attempt. They nevertheless remained in bronze medal position, aided by errors by fourth-place finishers Hocke/Kunkel of Germany.

2020–21 season 
Artemeva/Nazarychev made their Grand Prix debut at the 2020 Rostelecom Cup, where they finished fifth. They placed eighth at the 2021 Russian Championships, and then won the Russian junior national title.

2021–22 season 
Artemeva/Nazarychev were initially assigned to the 2021 Cup of China as their first Grand Prix, but following the event's cancellation they were reassigned to the 2021 Gran Premio d'Italia. Fourth in the short program, they rose to third in the free skate to win the bronze medal behind Chinese teams Sui/Han and Peng/Jin. At their second event, the 2021 Internationaux de France, they placed second in both programs to take the silver medal, making only one error in their free skate when Artemeva doubled and stepped out of her planned triple toe loop. Nazarychev said afterward "overall it was a good performance. We set goals for ourselves to do well on the Grand Prix and I think we fulfilled that."

At the 2022 Russian Championships, Artemeva/Nazarychev finished in fifth. They also competed at the junior edition, losing to Natalia Khabibullina / Ilya Knyazhuk. On 2 June 2022, it was announced that Artemeva/Nazarychev had ended their partnership. Nazarychev teamed up with Nadezhda Labazina.

Programs

With Artemeva

Competitive highlights 
GP: Grand Prix; CS: Challenger Series; JGP: Junior Grand Prix

With Artemeva

Detailed results 

Small medals for short and free programs awarded only at ISU Championships. Personal bests highlighted in bold.

With Artemeva

Senior results

Junior results

References

External links 
 

2001 births
Russian male pair skaters
Living people
Sportspeople from Perm, Russia
World Junior Figure Skating Championships medalists